The Ringer is an album by American jazz trumpeter-composer Charles Tolliver and his quartet Music Inc., recorded in 1969 and released the following year by the British label Polydor Records. The album's US release followed in 1975.

Recording and release 
The Ringer was the first album Tolliver recorded with his quartet Music Inc., formed with pianist Stanley Cowell. They recorded the songs in a session for Polydor Records on June 2, 1969, at the record label's studio in London. The recording was produced by Alan Bates, Polydor's record producer and A&R executive. The label released the album in the UK the following year. Bates' own label Freedom Records later released The Ringer in Europe and Japan, while Arista Records distributed it in the US in 1975.

Critical reception

In his review for AllMusic, Scott Yanow states "Tolliver is heard at the peak of his creative powers; it is strange that he never received the fame and recognition that he deserved".

Track listing
All compositions are by Charles Tolliver.

 "Plight" – 7:09
 "On the Nile" – 12:31
 "The Ringer" – 5:46
 "Mother Wit" – 8:46
 "Spur" – 5:02

Personnel
Information is taken from AllMusic.

Musicians
Charles Tolliver – trumpet
Stanley Cowell – piano
Steve Novosel – bass
Jimmy Hopps – drums

Technical personnel
 Alan Bates – production
 Carlos Olms – engineering
 Chris Whent – production
 Valerie Wilmer – liner notes

References

External links 
 

1970 albums
Charles Tolliver albums
Freedom Records albums
Polydor Records albums